Peter Carl Ludwig Schwarz (Julian, O.S.: 23 May 1822, Danzig-Gdańsk – 17 September 1894; Gregorian, N.S.: 4 June 1822 - 29 September 1894, St. George's?; Buried: Tartu) (referred to mostly as Ludwig Schwarz), was a Baltic German astronomer of Imperial Russia, explorer, and professor of astronomy at the University of Dorpat honored with the Konstantin Medal of the Imperial Russian Geographical Society. Schwarz also was a recipient of the Demidov Prize of the Academy of Sciences of St. Petersburg in 1865 for his work in geodesy.

Palaeoarctic Siberian Asia Expeditions
Following assignment by Friedrich Georg Wilhelm Struve as a field expedition astronomer (1849-1853) to study the Amur River, astronomer Schwarz led (1854-1862) the East Siberian Expedition of 1855 which extensively explored unknown and unmapped territory in Eastern Siberia, such as the Turan Range and the North Baikal Highlands.

The Siberian expedition went into central Asia, southeastern Asia, and northern China. Some of the routes travelled were as long as 10,000 miles. Utilizing his prior Amur field knowledge of astronomy he would determine geographical positions of certain points (geodesy) for preparation of geographical maps. The information would later be used in planning the construction of the Trans-Siberian Railway systems and others in southeast Asia.

The volumes reporting the results of the expedition were published in 1864. The separate tomes concerning the vegetation and wildlife reports were prepared by the expedition's botanist and zoologist Gustav Radde.

Dorpat Observatory
Ludwig Schwarz served as the Director of Dorpat Observatory (now Tartu Observatory) from 1872  to 1891, succeeding Thomas Clausen who held the position from 1866 to 1872. Upon the retirement of Schwarz from the directorship on 1 September 1891 the position became the responsibility of Grigori Levitski who held it until 1908.

During his tenure in later life he conducted studies of one third of the 10,000 celestial stars visible at Tartu.

Legacy
Radde's warbler, a leaf warbler bird that breeds in Siberia and winters in southeast Asia, bears a scientific name (Phylloscopus schwarzi) that commemorates Schwarz. The bird was described in 1863 by naturalist and fellow explorer Gustav Radde who served in the East Siberian Expedition of 1855 led by Schwarz.

Gallery

Works
His publications include:

German:
Schwarz, Ludwig (1889); Eine Studie auf dem Gebiete der Practischen Astronomie; Dorpat.
[English: A Study in the Field of Practical Astronomy].
Schwarz, Ludwig (1887-1893); Beobachtungen, angestellt und herausgegeben von Ludwig Schwarz, Band 17-20; Kaiserliche Universitats-Sternwarte, Dorpat (Jurjew)
[English: Observations made and published from Ludwig Schwarz, Volumes 17-20; Imperial University Observatory].

See also
List of astronomers
List of Russian astronomers and astrophysicists
List of Russian explorers
History of Siberia
Russian conquest of Siberia

Notes

Citations

References

Books
English:
Great Britain, India Office (1878), A Catalogue of Manuscript and Printed Reports, Field Books, Memoirs, Maps, etc., of the Indian Surveys, Deposited in the Map Room of the India Office. See Amur map catalogue entry appearing in the Asiatic Russia section, p. 511.
Mollin, Richard A. (2011), Algebraic Number Theory, Second Edition, CRC Press,  (ebook).
SCTLRAS (1900), Supplementary Catalogue of The Library of the Royal Astronomical Society, June 1884 – 1898, Royal Astronomical Society, Burlington House, London; Spottiswoode & Co., London (publisher).
. This reference uses "(1822-1894)" at p. 119.
German:
.
2 volumes: I. Die Saugethierfauna , 1862; II. Die Festlands-Ornis , 1864. From volume 2, p. 260, plate 9, figs. 1a, 1b, 1c (1863).
[English: Travel to the South of Eastern Siberia in the Years 1855-59: I. The Wildland Animal Fauna, 1862; II. The Mainland-Birds, 1864].
Collectively referred to as Reisen im Suden Ost-Sibiriens [English: Travel to the South East Siberians].

Journals
English:
EMWS , 23 November 1894.
Kropotkin (1903), (Prince) Pyotr Alexeyevich; and Freshfield, Douglas W., "Obituary. Dr. Gustav Radde." The Geographical Journal, Vol. 21, No. 5 (May, 1903), pp. 563–565. The Royal Geographical Society (publisher).
MNRAS (1888), Monthly Notices of the Royal Astronomical Society, Volume 48 (1887-1888), Burlington House, London; Spottiswoode & Co., London (publisher); entry as: Dorpat, Kaiserliche Universitats-Sternwarte, Band xvii. Angestellt und herausgegeben von Ludwig Schwarz.
. November 1894 issue. United Kingdom.
Outlook, 10 November 1894 issue, necrology entry for October 3.
PASP, San Francisco, USA.

Maps
Russian:
Amur Region, 1861.
Amur Region, 1864.
[English: Amur catalog entry of 2 Russian maps appears in the Great Britain, India Office (1878) book at p. 511 in the section "Asiatic Russia" [noted above] as: "The Amur. KAPTA Map of the Region of the AMUR with the upper parts of the Lena and Yenisei and the Island of Saghalin Constructed from the observation of the Siberian expedition of the Imperial Russian Geographical Society by Ludwig Schwarz astronomer to the expedition St Petersburg 1861 In Russian Scale 1 1,680,000 or about 27 miles to 1 inch on 7 sheets in a cover size of each 25 inches by 31. Another edition dated 1864."]

External links
Tartu Observatory profile of Ludwig Schwarz

1822 births
1894 deaths
Scientists from Gdańsk
19th-century explorers
19th-century geographers
19th-century German astronomers
Astronomers from the Russian Empire
Explorers from the Russian Empire
Geographers from the Russian Empire
Scientists from the Russian Empire
Full members of the Saint Petersburg Academy of Sciences
University of Tartu alumni
Academic staff of the University of Tartu
Baltic-German people
Explorers of Asia
Explorers of Central Asia
Explorers of Siberia
Demidov Prize laureates